Changling County is a county in the northwest of Jilin province, China, bordering Inner Mongolia to the west.

Administrative divisions
The county administers 12 towns and 10 townships.

Geography and climate
Changling is in the southwest part of Songyuan City and borders Nong'an County to the east, Gongzhuling and Shuangliao to the south, Horqin Left Middle Banner of Inner Mongolia to the west, and Tongyu County, Qian'an County, and Qian Gorlos County to the north.

Changling has a monsoon-influenced humid continental climate (Köppen Dwa) characterised by hot, humid summers, due to the monsoon, and long, very cold and dry winters, due to the Siberian anticyclone. A majority of the annual rainfall occurs in July and August. The frost-free period lasts 140 days.

References

 
County-level divisions of Jilin